TV 2 Radio was a Danish commercial radio station, set to compete with public financed stations DR P3 and DR P4. It began broadcasting at midnight, February 1, 2007. It ceased broadcasting September 8, 2008, and the frequencies were taken over by SBS Radio owned Nova FM.

Until November 14, 2007, the CEO of TV 2 Radio was former Venstre-politician Jens Rohde.

Reception
TV 2 Radio was advertised greatly, primarily on TV 2, for their hosts instead of content, and this was said to be the reason for their poor first ratings, marking a share of 3.5 per cent in their first month of broadcast, lower than Sky Radio's starting share of 4.75 pct. In the age 21-50 share, where TV 2's goal was to reach a 15 per cent share at the end of the year, they have so far just reached 5.3 pct. - in comparison DR's P3 had 27.6 pct. Nevertheless, P3's share had gone down by 4.3 percentage points.

Hosts

Programming 
The current programming is as follows (names in bold, hosts, where announced, in small-italic):

References

External links 
TV 2 Radio - official website
(now just redirects to tv2.dk, radio turns up no search results)

Radio stations in Denmark
Radio stations established in 2007
Radio stations disestablished in 2008
Defunct radio stations
Defunct mass media in Denmark